House of Councillors elections were held in  Japan on 23 July 1989.

There were several controversial issues dominating the pre-election atmosphere, all of which reflected negatively of the ruling LDP. The most important, according to most polls, was the introduction of an unpopular 3% consumption tax law which had been forced through the Diet by Prime Minister Noboru Takeshita despite boycotts by the opposition parties, an act which hurt the LDP's image with the public. A second issue was the infamous Recruit scandal, which induced the resignation of Takeshita and his cabinet members and left a major stain on the LDP's integrity to the public. There was also resistance to the LDP's gradual adoption of import liberalisation of food products, which lost the party their traditional rural voters resentful of farm imports. Even more, there was incumbent Prime Minister Sōsuke Uno's sex scandal which had come to light only a month earlier.

The result of all of this negative feeling towards the LDP was an unprecedented victory for the Japan Socialist Party (JSP), roughly doubling its share of the popular vote when compared to the previous House of Councillors election, and being the only major pre-existing party to see a net increase in its share of the popular vote; the other opposition parties, which had more success in the past while the JSP stagnated, saw net decreases in both popular votes as well as seat numbers. Moreover, although the Japanese Communist Party has historically contributed to vote splitting by fielding candidates in every district, the overall decline in support for the JCP is thought to have helped jointly-backed opposition candidates in this election. In any event, the JSP would cooperate with the other opposition parties in order to form a majority coalition over a minority LDP, a historical first for the House of Councillors.

Meanwhile, the LDP lost the popular vote in an election for the first time in its history, and the only prefectures in which any LDP candidates were able to win any seats were Toyama, Shiga, and Wakayama. The LDP's losses were strongest in single-member constituencies, but less strongly felt in multi-member constituencies, no doubt partly due to the above mentioned relative lack of vote splitting in this election. After this election, the LDP designated as its new leader Toshiki Kaifu, who belonged to the same historical faction as Takeo Miki, and who, like Miki, was reform-minded; ironically, Kaifu later defected from the LDP in the mid 1990s in order to join the opposition, although he eventually returned to the LDP in the 21st century.

Results

By constituency

References

About Japan Series (1999), Changing Japanese Politics, No. 24, Tokyo: Foreign Press Center.
Mahendra Prakash (2004), Coalition Experience in Japanese Politics: 1993-2003, New Delhi: JNU.

Japan
House of Councillors election
House of Councillors (Japan) elections
Japanese House of Councillors election
Election and referendum articles with incomplete results